Norwegian county road 407 is a Norwegian county road in Agder county, Norway.  The  highway runs between the village of Vik in Grimstad municipality and Sponvika on the south side of the city of Arendal in Arendal municipality.  Prior to the transportation reforms of 2010, this road was a Norwegian national road, but since then it was taken over by the county.

Description

Grimstad municipality
 at Bringsværmoen
 from Temse to Lunde
 to  Lia and Steinsmoen
 at Lunde
 Strubru bridge over the river Nidelva

Arendal municipality
Rykeneveien
 Gjennestadveien from Helle to Klidningsklev
 to Rannekleiv or Sandstø
 from Sponvika to Vestre Strømsbu
 Northern terminus at  Vesterveien

References

407
Road transport in Agder
Grimstad
Arendal
Former Norwegian national roads